Clarence Roy Gray (31 October 1892 – 7 April 1933) was an Australian rules footballer who played with Collingwood and Melbourne in the Victorian Football League (VFL).

Notes

External links 

1892 births
1933 deaths
Australian rules footballers from Victoria (Australia)
Australian Rules footballers: place kick exponents
Collingwood Football Club players
Melbourne Football Club players